The Symphony No. 12 in E major (Hoboken I/12) is a symphony by Joseph Haydn. The symphony was composed in 1763,  at the age of 31, under the patronage of Prince Nikolaus Esterházy.

It is scored for 2 oboes, bassoon, 2 horns, strings and continuo. The symphony is homotonal and in three movements:

Allegro, 
Adagio,  in E minor
Presto, 

The second movement is in "siciliano", or rocking rhythm, similar to the pastoral slow movements of Symphonies 27 and B.

References

Symphony 012
Compositions in E major
1763 compositions